Mona Gordon Wilson (1894–1981) was a public health nurse on Prince Edward Island, Canada.

Life 
The daughter of Harold Wilson and Elizabeth Farquahar Tainsh. she was born in Toronto and was educated at the Johns Hopkins School of Nursing. She served in the American Army Nursing Corps during World War I. After the war, she served with the American Red Cross in eastern Europe. She returned to Canada, earned a degree in public health nursing from the University of Toronto and became chief Red Cross public health nurse for Prince Edward Island, serving from 1922 to 1931. Wilson introduced public health initiatives such as nursing classes, school programs, health clinics, home visits and Junior Red Cross branches to the island. In 1931, when the province established a Department of Health, she was named Provincial Director of Public Health Nursing. From 1940 to 1946, she was assistant commissioner of the British Red Cross for Newfoundland.

Wilson was awarded the Florence Nightingale Medal and, in 1946, was appointed an officer of the Order of the British Empire.

She also helped establish a number of organizations on Prince Edward Island, including the Girl Guides, the Zonta Club and the Business and Professional Women's Club of Charlottetown.

Wilson retired from nursing in 1961. She died in 1981.

A biography for Mona Gordon Wilson She Answered Every Call was published by Doug Baldwin in 1997.

In 2010, Wilson was named a Person of National Historic Significance by the Canadian government.

References 

1894 births
1981 deaths
Persons of National Historic Significance (Canada)
Officers of the Order of the British Empire
Female nurses in World War I
Florence Nightingale Medal recipients
Johns Hopkins School of Nursing alumni
University of Toronto alumni
Canadian women nurses
Canadian military nurses